Sclerosis (also sclerosus in the Latin names of a few disorders) is a hardening of tissue and other anatomical features; it may refer to: 

 Sclerosis (medicine), a hardening of tissue
 in zoology, a process which hardens forms sclerites, a hardened exoskeleton
 in botany, a process which hardens plant tissue by adding fibers and sclereids, resulting in sclerenchyma
 In economics, see: Eurosclerosis

ar:تَصلُب
ca:Esclerosi
mk:Склероза
pl:Stwardnienie
pt:Esclerose
fi:Skleroosi
sv:Skleros
zh:硬化